Pune is the second largest city of Maharashtra state, India and is surrounded by the Sahyadri Mountain range. It occupied an important place during the Maratha Empire between 1674 and 1881. Hence, it homes numerous forts and wadas highlighting typical Maratha architecture. Forts are one of the main attractions including Lohagad and Visapur Forts. It also has rich cultural and spiritual history with many temples and ashrams spread across the city. In additional to local adventure and history junkies, Pune also attracts many international tourist because of Osho International Meditation Resort that is located in heart of Pune at Koregaon Park.

Tourist attractions in Pune

Museums

 Darshan Museum
 Raja Dinkar Kelkar Museum
 Pune Tribal Museum
 Mahatama Phule Museum
 Tilak Museum
 Chhatrapati Shivaji Maharaj Museum of Indian History
 Blades of Glory Cricket Museum
 Joshi's Museum of Miniature Railway
 National War Memorial Southern Command
 Honey Bee Museum, CBRTI

Religious Sites in Pune
 Shreemant Dagdusheth Halwai Sarvajanik GanpatiShreemant Dagdusheth Halwai Ganapati Temple (Marathi: श्रीमंत दगडूशेठ हलवाई गणपती) in Pune is dedicated to the Hindu God Ganesh. The temple is popular in Maharashtra and is visited by thousands of pilgrims every year.Devotees of the temple include celebrities and Chief Ministers of Maharashtra who visit during the annual ten-day Ganeshotsav festival. The main Ganesh idol is insured for sum of ₹10 million (US$160,000). People are celebrating 125 years of celebration for this Ganapati in the year 2017.
 ISKCON NVCC Temple
 Sri Balaji Mandir
 Sarasbaug Ganpati Temple
 Chaturshrungi Temple
 Pu La Deshpande Garden
 Ranjangaon Ganpati Temple
 Parvati Temple
 Katraj Jain Temple
 Pataleshwar Cave Temple
 Bhuleshwar Temple
 Shri Satya Sai Pandurang Kshetra
 Sant Dnyaneshwar's Samadhi Mandir
 Morgaon Mayureshwar Temple
 BAPS Shri Swaminarayan Mandir
 Ramdara Mandir
 Trishundha Ganpati Temple
 Shri Wagheshwar Temple
Shree Baba Maharaj Sahsrabuddhe Samadhi Mandir

Park 
 Empress garden
 Gram Sanskruti Udyan Village Park
 Kamla Nehru Park
 Osho Garden
 Pu La Deshpande Garden
 Seven Wonders Dream Park
 Sambhaji Park.
nisargshala

Forts

 Sinhagad
 Shaniwar Wada
 Aga Khan Palace
 Shivneri
 Rajgad
 Torna
 Purandar
 Rohida
 Tung
 Hadsar
 Malhargad
 Koraigad
 Ghangad
 Lohagad
 Visapur Fort
 Tikona
 Mohangad 
 Raigad
 Kenjalgad

Lohagad and Visapur Forts
Lohagad and Visapur Forts are located about 65 km to the west of Pune. The forts were primarily built to boost trade by safeguarding the important trade route through Bhor Ghat. The forts can be easily reached by roadways or railways. Trains are available from Pune to Malavali Railway Station, which is the nearest railways station to these twin forts. One needs to then travel by road to the small village of Lohgad Wadi which lies just next to the forts.

The two forts are unique in their formation and connected together by a ridge which is popularly known as ‘gaymukh’. There are four massive doors on the way to forts. They are named as Ganesh, Narayan, Hanuman and Mahadarwaja. There are some inscriptions that suggest that the Ganesh door was built during the rule of Nana Phadanavis. There is a 1500-meter-long wall that surrounds the fort and is easily visible from a long distance. The width of the wall is 30 meters. On the eastern side of the Lohagad Fort, there is a huge hole that is easily visible by the passing train from a very far distance.

Visapur Fort is located adjacent to Lohagad Fort and one needs to walk around a long wall to get to this unique fort. Visapur Fort was built after Lohagad Fort during 1713–1720 CE by Balaji Vishwanath, who was the first Peshwa of the Maratha Empire. There is a long wall that forms a fortification around Visapur Fort. The hill on which this fort is built is also famous for its historical caves of Bhaje that existed even before the fort was built. These caves are also important for the historians because of their Buddhist connection. There are a few stone houses located on this hill which is believed to the home of Peshwas. Apart from the stone houses and caves, once can also find some iron guns and cannons that give glimpses of the Maratha Rule. A lot of people also come to visit a huge idol of Lord Hanuman on the hill.

With a number of forts in and around Pune there are some trekking places like The Taljai hill, Hanuman tekdi, Vetal tekdi which are most preferred places for treks or for jogging. Khadkawasla, Mulsi and Panshet dams are most visited places during the monsoon, they are like a weekend nature retreat for tourists.

Markets and shopping

 Tulsi Baug
 Juna Bazar
 Laxmi Road
 Phule Market
 Fashion Street
 Mahatma Gandhi Road
 Fergusson College Road
 Raviwar Peth 
 Hong Kong Lane
Appa Balwant Chowk (also known as A.B.C.)
Honey Parlour, Central Bee Research and Training Institute

Malls in Pune
 Phoenix Marketcity (Pune)
 Kumar Pacific Mall
 Amanora mall
 Seasons Mall
 93 Avenue

References

Tourist
Pune
Pune
 List